Sutton Symes, D.D. (27 November 1679 – 18 November 1751) was Dean of Achonry from 1733 until his death.

Handcock was born in County Wexford and educated at Trinity College, Dublin. His wife died on 20 July 1747.

References

1751 deaths
1679 births
20th-century Irish Roman Catholic priests
Alumni of Trinity College Dublin
Deans of Achonry
18th-century Irish Anglican priests